Evaristo Vicente Barrera (December 30, 1911 – June 7, 1982) was an Argentine football striker. He played for Racing Club de Avellaneda and a number of football clubs in Italy. He was born in Rosario.

Barrera started his professional career in 1932 with Racing Club, he was twice the topscorer in the Argentine Primera, in 1934 with 34 goals and in 1936 with 32 goals. By the end of his time with Racing Club, Barrera had scored 136 goals in 142 games. He still holds the record as the club's highest scoring player.

In 1938 Barrera moved to Italy, he played for Lazio and Napoli in Serie A before dropping down into the lower leagues where he played for Ascoli.

During the war years he played for Novara and Gozzano in the Italian War Championships. After the end of the war he played for Cremonese and Mortara, retiring in 1948.

Barrera had a spell as manager of Novara between 1956 and 1958.

External links
 Enciclopedia de Calcio profile 

1911 births
1982 deaths
Footballers from Rosario, Santa Fe
Argentine footballers
Association football forwards
Racing Club de Avellaneda footballers
S.S. Lazio players
S.S.C. Napoli players
Ascoli Calcio 1898 F.C. players
Novara F.C. players
Argentine football managers
Novara F.C. managers
U.S. Cremonese players
Argentine expatriate footballers
Expatriate footballers in Italy
Argentine expatriate sportspeople in Italy
Argentine Primera División players
Serie A players
Serie B players
Expatriate football managers in Italy
A.C. Gozzano players